Mark Francis McArdle (born 21 December 1956) is an Australian politician and former Deputy Leader of the Opposition in Queensland. He was a Member of the Legislative Assembly of Queensland between 2004 and 2020, representing the electorate of Caloundra on the Sunshine Coast. Initially a Liberal Party member, in 2007 he became the party leader and the following year oversaw a merger with the National Party that produced the Liberal National Party.

McArdle has held many parliamentary party positions, including stints as a Shadow Minister for Justice, State Development & Innovation; Emergency Services; Seniors; and Local Government. He has also served the Shadow Attorney General and the Parliamentary Liberal Party Whip.

Political career

Member of Parliament 
McArdle was first elected to Parliament at the 2004 Queensland State Election, succeeding former Deputy Premier Joan Sheldon.  In the 2006 Queensland election, McArdle was returned as the Member for Caloundra, taking a 2.6-point swing in his favour, and increasing his margin to 3.9%. Following electoral redistributions in 2008 prior to the 2009 state election, McArdle's margin was reduced to 1.9%.

He was returned to Parliament again in the 2012 State Election. At the 2015 state election, Mark McArdle successfully defeated Labor candidate Jason Hunt to retain his state seat, despite a swing of over 20% against him. He was returned to his seat again, in the 2017 Queensland Elections.

In June 2019 McArdle announced he would retire at the 2020 Queensland state election in October.

Ministerial Portfolios & Parliamentary Positions 
McArdle served as the State Leader of the Parliamentary Liberal Party and the Deputy Opposition Leader, between 2007 and 2009. He was installed as a compromise candidate in the Leadership Contest of December 2007, after a deadlock between supporters of former leader Bruce Flegg and young challenger Tim Nicholls. He was made Deputy Leader of the Liberal National Party after the Queensland Liberal Party merged with the Queensland National Party. After the 2009 Queensland election, Mark McArdle vacated his position as Deputy Leader, as did Leader Lawrence Springborg. Days later, John-Paul Langbroek was elected Leader with Lawrence Springborg as Deputy Leader.

Additional to his Parliamentary Party responsibilities, McArdle assumed the role of Shadow Minister for Health in August 2008, until the LNP's emphatic victory in 2012.  Following the party leadership change, McArdle remained in his position as Shadow Minister for Health. After the Liberal National Party's landslide win in the 2012 Queensland state election, McArdle was appointed as Minister for Energy and Water Supply by Premier Campbell Newman, overseeing long-awaited and modernising reforms in energy and water security, after a series of natural disasters and an historical drought.

In 2013, he revealed that he had prostate cancer, and took time off from his portfolio to battle the disease.

Party Involvement 
McArdle has held many party positions as well, including as Chair of the Fisher Federal Divisional Council; Chair of the Fisher Business Branch; and as a Member of the State Executive of the then Liberal Party.

2006 Election Controversy
Prior to the 2006 Election, McArdle, by then an emerging force within the Parliament, came under sustained criticism from the Labor Party and local media for his role in the collapse of mortgage schemes run by Boyce Garrick Lawyers. Premier Peter Beattie claimed that his role in the collapse made him unfit for such a leadership position. McArdle responded by pointing out that he was cleared of any fault in the collapse by the Queensland Law Society in its investigation in 2001. He ultimately retained his seat.

Activities
McArdle takes an active role in the administration of his portfolio. He regularly attends relevant conferences and meets with key industry executives.

References

External links
 Ministerial Diary for Mark McArdle
 Liberal National Party of Queensland

1956 births
Living people
Members of the Queensland Legislative Assembly
Liberal Party of Australia members of the Parliament of Queensland
Liberal National Party of Queensland politicians
Australian solicitors
21st-century Australian politicians
Deputy opposition leaders